bTV Lady is  a Bulgarian female-oriented  television channel. Along with bTV, bTV Comedy, bTV Cinema and bTV Action and RING are part of bTV Media Group, owned by the US media conglomerate CME(owned by WarnerMedia/AT&T)(75%). The bulk of the program schedule of the channel comprises reality and talk show programs, Turkish and Latin American telenovelas, programs for health, beauty, home care, family and garden, American series, romantic films and local productions.

Television networks in Bulgaria
Bulgarian-language television stations
Television channels and stations established in 2012